Trois Pistoles station is a Via Rail station in Trois-Pistoles, Quebec, Canada. It is located on Rue de la Gare and is staffed and is wheelchair-accessible. Trois Pistoles is served by Via Rail's Ocean; the Montreal – Gaspé train was suspended in 2013. Both trains shared the same rail line between Montreal and Matapédia.

External links

Via Rail page for the Ocean
Via Rail page for the Montreal – Gaspé train

Via Rail stations in Quebec
Railway stations in Bas-Saint-Laurent